Don McMillan is an American comedian, actor, and former engineer based in the San Francisco Bay.

Education 
McMillan earned a Bachelor of Science in electrical engineering from Lehigh University and a Master of Science in electrical engineering from Stanford University.

Career 
McMillan worked AT&T Bell Laboratories, where he was a part of the team that designed the world's first 32-bit microprocessor. He then moved to the Silicon Valley, where he worked at VLSI Technology as a computer chip designer. During his six years at VLSI, he designed more than 50 standard and ASIC designs, many of which are still in use.

His comedy is stand-up based on technical comedy and corporate comedy. One of his popular shows is Life After Death by PowerPoint which has been popular on Youtube and for live events.

In 2022, McMillan competed on the television show America's Got Talent, where he advanced to the live shows as one of the top 55 qualifiers. He was third in his group of eleven qualifiers and was eliminated, as only the top two of the group advanced to the finale.

Filmography

Film

Television

References

External links

YouTube Channel
Bio of Don McMillan on premierespeakers.com

Year of birth missing (living people)
Living people
American stand-up comedians
America's Got Talent contestants
Stanford University alumni
Scientists from California
American electrical engineers
Engineers from California